Bird, stylized as bird (born December 9, 1975 as Yuki Kitayama (北山有紀)), is a Japanese singer.

History 

Kitayama graduated from the Notre Dame Academy, a girls-only high school in the Kansai region. She then attended Kansai University and graduated with a degree in sociology. While she was in university, she was a member of the school's light music club.

After graduating, she spent a year in New York City. Returning to Osaka in the late 1990s, she started her singing career by singing at various jazz clubs. After achieving fame in the locality, she was discovered by record producer Shinichi Osawa, better known as Mondo Grosso.

In 1998, Kitayama was featured in Zeebra's Mirai e no Kagi (Osawa's Realized Mix) released in the mini-album The Rhyme Animal Remix EP.1. She came up with the alias bird around this time, because her head resembled a bird's nest during her debut.  Moreover, she expressed that she wanted her music to echo the song of small birds.

On March 20, 1999, she released her first single Souls on Osawa's label RealEyes. In July of the same year, bird released her first eponymously titled album on the Sony Music Japan label, which sold over 700,000 copies and won her the award of Japan Gold Record for Newcomers.

After RealEyes became independent from Sony Records, bird was able to become the lyricist and producer for her own music.

She is married to illustrator Jun Miura.

Discography

Singles

Albums

Other albums

VHS・DVD

References

External links
 bird-watch - Official Site
 bird - Sony Music Japan - bird's page at Sony Music Japan
 bird - Universal J - bird's page at Universal Music J

1975 births
Living people
Musicians from Kyoto Prefecture
Kansai University alumni
21st-century Japanese singers
21st-century Japanese women singers